Peyre is the name or part of the name of the following communes in France:

 La Chaze-de-Peyre, in the Lozère department
 Peyre, Landes, in the Landes department
 Saint-Léger-de-Peyre, in the Lozère department
 Saint-Sauveur-de-Peyre, in the Lozère department
 Sainte-Colombe-de-Peyre, in the Lozère department
 Peyre, Aveyron is also a village, part of the commune of Comprégnac, in the Aveyron department

Persons:
 Henri Peyre (1901–1988), an American linguist of French origin
 Marie-Joseph Peyre (1730–1785), a French architect
 Natacha Peyre, a former glamour model and sex symbol 
 Sully-André Peyre (1890-1961), French poet and essayist.